Motorway 25 is a motorway in Greece. It connects the Greek-Bulgarian border at Promachonas in the north with the Motorway 2 north of the city of Thessaloniki.

Exit list 

The exits of the A25 motorway:

Gallery

References 

25
Roads in Central Macedonia